Monstre Cosmic is the third and final studio album from the French band Monade, released on 19 February 2008 on Too Pure records.

Track listing

Personnel
Credits adapted from liner notes.

 Lætitia Sadier – guitar, singing, trombone, additional sounds
 Marie Merlet – bass guitar, singing
 Nicolas Etienne – keys , guitar , sleeve
 David Loquier – drums 
 Joe Watson – various keys and piano  acoustic guitar , string arrangements , production 
 Emma Mario – drums and percussion , recording , additional sounds
 Julien Gasc – bass, slide guitar, singing. piano, keys 
 Rachel Ortas – additional singing , illustrations
 Marie-Laure Prioleau – strings
 Emmanuèle Faure – strings
 Nicolas Miller – strings
 Rainer Halter – strings

References

External links
 

2008 albums